Sir Charles Waldstein (March 30, 1856 – March 21, 1927), known as Sir Charles Walston from 1918 to 1927, was an Anglo-American archaeologist. He also competed at the 1896 Summer Olympics in Athens.

Life
Waldstein was born into a Jewish family in New York City, United States, on March 30, 1856, third son of Henry Waldstein, a merchant, and Sophie, daughter of L. Srisheim, of New York. He was of Austrian descent.

Waldstein was educated at Columbia University (A.M., 1873), and also studied at Heidelberg (Ph.D., 1875). In 1880, he became university lecturer on classical archaeology at Cambridge University, and in 1883 university reader. From 1883 to 1889 he was director of the Fitzwilliam Museum. In 1889 he was called to Athens as director of the American School of Classical Studies, which office he held until 1893, when he became professor at the same institution. In 1894 he was made a fellow of King's College. In 1895 he returned to England as Slade Professor of Fine Art at Cambridge; and he held this chair until 1901. During his stay in Athens he directed the excavations of the Archaeological Institute of America at the site of ancient Plataea, Eretria, where he claimed to have unearthed the tomb of Aristotle, the Heraeum of Argos, among other discoveries. Later he formed an international committee to promote the excavation of Herculaneum.

He was knighted in 1912, appointed as Knight of the Danish Order of the Dannebrog, and appointed Commander of the Greek Order of the Redeemer.

He married Florence, daughter of D. L. Einstein and widow of Theodore Seligman, in 1909. They had one son, Henry, and a daughter, Evelyn Sophie Alexandra, who married the judge Sir Patrick Browne. He changed his surname to Walston in 1918 and died in 1927 whilst on a Mediterranean cruise.

Publications 
Besides writing the following books, Waldstein also published in journals numerous reports on his excavations. He wrote three short stories under the pseudonym 'Gordon Seymour' which were later released under his own name as The Surface of Things (1899).
Balance of Emotion and Intellect (1878)
Essays on the Art of Phidias (1885)
The Jewish Question and the Mission of the Jews (1889, anon.; 2nd ed. 1900)
The Work of John Ruskin (1894)
The Study of Art in Universities (1895)
The Expansion of Western Ideals and the World's Peace (1899)
The Argive Heraeum (1902)
Art in the Nineteenth Century (1903)
Aristodemocracy: From the Great War back to Moses, Christ and Plato (1916)
Harmonism and Conscious Evolution (1922)

Olympic Games 
Waldstein competed at the 1896 Summer Olympics in Athens in the military rifle event. His final score and place in the competition are unknown, but his first two strings of 10 shots apiece resulted in scores of 354 and 154. This put him at 508 points halfway through competition, though the rest of the results have been lost.

Further reading 
 Joseph Jacobs and Frederick T. Haneman, Jewish Encyclopedia.

  (Excerpt available) includes reprint of article "The Olympian Games at Athens" by Charles Waldstein, originally published in The Field magazine, May 1896.

References

External links 

 
 
Catalogued papers of Sir Charles Walston, King's College, Cambridge

1856 births
1927 deaths
American Ashkenazi Jews
American people of English-Jewish descent
American archaeologists
English archaeologists
Classical archaeologists
Columbia College (New York) alumni
Heidelberg University alumni
Fellows of King's College, Cambridge
People associated with the Fitzwilliam Museum
Directors of museums in the United Kingdom
American classical scholars
Olympic shooters of the United States
Shooters at the 1896 Summer Olympics
19th-century sportsmen
American male sport shooters
ISSF rifle shooters
American expatriates in the United Kingdom
Knights Bachelor
Knights of the Order of the Dannebrog
Classical scholars of the University of Cambridge
Charles